Dead ball is a term in many ball sports in which the ball is deemed temporarily not playable, and no movement may be made with it or the players from their respective positions of significance. Depending on the sport, this event may be quite routine, and often occurs between individual plays of the game.

Gridiron football
In gridiron football, a dead ball is a condition that occurs between football plays, after one of the following has occurred:

 The player with the ball runs out of bounds
 The player with the ball is downed, either by being tackled to the ground or by deliberately downing himself ("taking a knee")
 A forward pass touches the ground or travels out of bounds without being caught (incomplete pass)
 Any kick travels out of bounds and/or hits the goal post or crossbar in flight
 The ball is fumbled out of bounds
 A scoring play occurs
 
 In certain situations, depending on specific league rules, following a punt. For example, if the punt enters the end zone without being touched (an automatic touchback), the punt is successfully fair caught, or the punt is downed by the kicking team before being touched by the receivers

The ball remains dead until it is snapped to begin the next play. During the time in which the ball is dead, the offensive team may not attempt to advance it and no change of possession can take place. The clock may or may not be stopped during this time, depending on the circumstances.

In the past, in the NFL, the ball was also dead if it came into the possession of the defense for any reason during the try after a touchdown.  This rule was changed for the 2015 season, allowing the ball to remain live so that the defense could attempt to return it for a defensive two-point conversion.

Flag football
Times when it can be a dead ball:
anytime the ball hits the ground (also called a fumble)
the ball is blocked, not caught, by usually the defender. If the ball is caught, the defender can make a run for touchdown.
the ball carrier's flag is pulled or somehow falls to the ground.
the ball carrier falls to the ground. If any other part of the body of the ball carrier, other than the hands and feet, touch the ground, it is a dead ball.
See more information in flag football

Baseball

In baseball, when the ball is dead, no runners may advance beyond the respective bases they are entitled to, and no runners may be put out.  The ball becomes dead when:

 A batter is touched by a pitch or a batted ball (hit by pitch)
 The plate umpire hinders a catcher's throw attempt and the throw does not directly retire a runner
 A ball is illegally batted, such as when a batter hits the ball while outside of the batter's box
 A foul ball is not caught
 A fair ball touches a runner or an umpire on fair territory before it touches an infielder (including the pitcher)
 A fair ball touches a runner or an umpire before it has passed an infielder other than the pitcher
 A live ball lodges in the umpire's or catcher's equipment or in a fence or in another object on the field
 Any legal pitch touches a runner trying to score
 A live ball passes out of the playing field (unless it hits or crosses over a base on the ground)
 A runner or spectator commits interference
 The defense leaves the field after the half inning or game ends
 The venue's ground rules call for a dead ball ruling for a ball striking an above-ground obstruction (usually involving the roof of a domed or retractable-roofed stadium), such as the Tampa Bay Rays' Tropicana Field, regarding the catwalks and overhanging speakers above the field. In the past, overhead dead ball ground rules also existed for the Kingdome in Seattle and Minneapolis's Hubert H. Humphrey Metrodome
 An umpire calls time. Umpires typically call "time" after being asked to do so by a participant. An umpire in chief (plate umpire) will also call "time" when:
 Weather, darkness or similar conditions make play impossible or dangerous
 Light failure makes it difficult or impossible for the umpires to follow the play
 An accident incapacitates a player or an umpire
 The umpire wishes to examine the ball, to consult with either manager, or for any similar cause.
 An umpire orders a player or any other person removed from the playing field.
 A balk or obstruction is committed and immediate ensuing play ends
 The catcher interferes with the batter before the time of pitch
 An umpire declares "no pitch" after debris or a flying object (such as a bird) collides with the pitched ball.

In general, the ball does not automatically become dead after playing action ends.  So, for example, although the recording of a third out generally winds down a half inning, the ball is not automatically dead.  If it is to the advantage of the defense to attempt to record a fourth out for any reason, the ball is live and such a play is permitted.

After a dead ball, the ball becomes alive again when the pitcher stands on the pitcher's plate ready to pitch, the batter, catcher and umpire are ready, and the umpire calls or signals "Play."

Players and coaches may ask an umpire for "time," but they themselves may not call "time" and cause the ball to become dead.  Nevertheless, "time" is usually granted by the umpire when asked, and thus, colloquially, it is often said that players or coaches indeed can "call time."  Unlike sports which have clocks to time the play, the phrase "time out" is not used in baseball. Likewise, there is no limit to the number of times a team can "call time."

In baseball, the term "dead ball" is also used in the context of the dead-ball era, a phase during the early history of the game in the early 1900s.  In this context, the ball was not actually "dead" but for various reasons tended to be difficult to hit for distance, resulting in low scores and few home runs by modern standards.

Cricket
In cricket, a dead ball is a particular state of play in which the players may not perform any of the active aspects of the game, meaning batters may not score runs and fielders may not attempt to get batters out.

"The words 'dead ball' were first used in the laws in 1798", in relation to a new law imposing a penalty of five runs if the fielder stopped the ball with his hat. "Before 1798 the words 'dead ball' were not used but the meaning was implicit in some of the other laws of the day."

The ball, referring to the cricket ball, becomes live when the bowler begins his run up in preparation to bowl at the batter. In the live state, play occurs with the batters able to score runs and get out.

The ball becomes dead when any of the following situations occur:
The umpire is satisfied that, with adequate reason, the batter is not ready for the delivery of the ball.
The ball passes the batter, is gathered by the wicket-keeper, and the batters obviously decline to attempt to take runs.
The ball is finally settled in the hands of the wicket-keeper or the bowler, and the batters obviously decline to attempt to take any more runs.
The umpire feels that both the fielding team and the batters consider the ball no longer to be in play.
The ball reaches the boundary and four runs or six runs are scored.
Either batter is out.
The ball lodges in the clothing or equipment of a batter or umpire.
The ball lodges in a protective helmet worn by a fielder.
The batters attempt to run leg byes, and, in the umpire's opinion, no attempt was made either to hit the ball with the bat or to evade it; this nullifies the leg byes.
The umpire intervenes in the occurrence of injury or unfair play.

Umpires may also call dead ball at their discretion, in the case of a series for events for which there is no provision in either the Laws of Cricket or agreements made prior to the match. This happened on 9 October 2005, when Australian batter Michael Hussey hit the retracted roof at the Telstra Dome. What would have been six in an open stadium was ruled a dead ball, and no runs were awarded.

Note that the ball becomes dead as soon as a batter is out, so it is not possible to dismiss the other batter immediately. Thus the baseball concept of a double play cannot occur in cricket.

If necessary to make it clear to the players and scorers that the umpire considers the ball to be dead, the umpire signals dead ball by crossing and uncrossing his arms in front of his body.

Association football

In association football (soccer), the term "dead ball" refers to a situation when the ball is not in play, e.g. when play has not been restarted after the ball has gone out of bounds or a foul has been committed. It also applies before each kick-off, either at the start of each half or after a goal has been scored. In a dead ball situation, players can position the ball with their hands prior to restarting play. Furthermore, even though the ball is not in play, the referee may still issue cautions or ejections (yellow or red cards) for any incident that occurs off the ball. Fouls, on the other hand, can occur only while the ball is in play.

Basketball
In basketball, most or any time play is stopped the ball is considered dead, such as when a foul has been committed and called by a referee, a foul shot has been attempted and another one is yet to be attempted, or the ball has gone out of bounds.  Player substitutions may then be made.
Section IV of the NBA rule book contains the official definition of a dead ball.

Pickleball
A dead ball is declared in the game of pickleball when any of the following occur; one of the players commits a fault, the ball hits a permanent object, or a hinder is declared. When a player commits a fault, the other side wins the point. If the ball strikes a permanent object, such as the net post, a referee, or fence, the ball is declared dead, but the point is awarded based on whether or not the ball bounced on the opposing side before hitting the permanent object. If the ball does not bounce on the opposing side's court before hitting the permanent object, the opposing side wins the point. If the ball bounces on the opposing side's court prior to hitting the permanent object, the side that last hit the ball wins the point. If a hinderance results in a dead ball, such as when a person, errant ball or other object enters the court, the serve is restarted with no penalty to either side.

Rugby league
Each end of a rugby league field has a dead ball line; when the ball (or player in possession) crosses or touches this line, the ball is said to have gone dead. This results in a goal line drop out if the defending team had caused the ball to go dead; otherwise, a 20-metre restart ensues.

See also

Bouncing ball
Cricket terminology
Dead-ball era (Baseball)
Glossary of American football
Glossary of association football terms
Place kick
Set piece (football)

References 

Terminology used in multiple sports